League tables for teams participating in Kakkonen, the third tier of the Finnish Soccer League system, in 2004. Kakkonen was reduced to 3 groups of 14 teams for season 2006.

League tables 2004

Southern Group, Etelälohko 

NB: Jokerit withdrew from Premier Division and were bought by HJK.  The revamped club was named Klubi-04 and became HJK's "reserve" team. They obtained a place in Division Two South.

Eastern Group, Itälohko 

NB: SäyRi's place in Division Two was taken by Jyväskylä United.

Western Group, Länsilohko

Northern Group, Pohjoislohko 

NB: Because GBK were promoted to Division One, Division Two North was played with 11 teams.

Promotion Playoff

Round 1

First Leg
JIPPO         2-1 Atlantis
PK-35         1-0 JJK
OLS           0-0 FJK
TPV           1-2 KPV

Second Leg
Atlantis      2-1 JIPPO     [aet, 4-3 pen]
JJK           0-1 PK-35
FJK           2-2 OLS
KPV           1-0 TPV

Round 2

First Leg
OLS           2-1 Atlantis
PK-35         6-0 KPV

Second Leg
Atlantis      3-1 OLS   [aet]
KPV           1-2 PK-35

Atlantis and PK-35 promoted, KPV and OLS to division one/division two playoff.

Division One/Division Two Playoff

First Leg
KPV           1-1 Närpes Kraft
OLS           0-1 VG-62

Second Leg
VG-62         3-1 OLS
Närpes Kraft  1-1 KPV   [aet, 1-4 pen]

KPV promoted, Närpes Kraft relegated. VG-62 remain at second level.

Relegation playoff

First Leg
PS-44         3-2 TKT
Jaro II       2-2 Tervarit
Futura        1-5 KäPa
Ponnistus     2-0 Pantterit
FCV           1-3  KajHa

Second Leg
TKT           4-1 PS-44
Pantterit     3-1 Ponnistus
Tervarit      5-2 Jaro II
KäPa          3-1 Futura
KajHa         6-1 FCV

Ponnistus promoted, Pantterit relegated. TKT, Tervarit, KäPa and KajHa remain at third level.

Footnotes

References and sources
Finnish FA, Suomen Palloliitto 

Kakkonen seasons
3
Fin
Fin